Ophiusa xylochroa is a moth of the family Erebidae first described by Herbert Druce in 1912. It is found in Africa, including Congo region.

References
 

Ophiusa
Insects of the Democratic Republic of the Congo
Moths of Africa
Moths described in 1912